The 6th Central People's Committee (CPC) of North Korea was elected by the 1st Session of the 6th Supreme People's Assembly on 17 December 1977. It was replaced on 5 April 1982 by the 7th CPC.

Members

References

Citations

Bibliography
Books:
 

6th Supreme People's Assembly
Central People's Committee
1977 establishments in North Korea
1982 disestablishments in North Korea